The desert fungi are a variety of terricolous fungi inhabiting the biological soil crust of arid regions. Those exposed to the sun typically contain melanin and are resistant to high temperatures, dryness and low nutrition. Species that are common elsewhere (e.g. Penicillium spp. and common soil Aspergillus spp.) do not thrive in these conditions. Producing large dark unicellular spores also helps survival. Sexually reproducing ascomycetes, especially  Chaetomium spp., have developed resilience by growing thick, dark perithecia. Under desert shrubs, however, more sensitive species such as Gymnoascus reesii'' prevail.

References

Fungi by adaptation
Deserts

The Desert fungi adapts to their environment with their morphological features to allow for nutrients and water to enter through their pores. . Not only have desert fungi learned to fend for themselves, they've also became a survival mechanism for the community organisms as well promoting growth and advances.